Sargocentron xantherythrum, commonly known as Hawaiian squirrelfish  or striped squirrelfish, is a member of the squirrelfish family that is endemic to the Hawaiian Islands. It occasionally makes its way into the aquarium trade.

Description
This fish has a red coloration with white stripes running along the body. It has sharp gill spines and rough scales that can cause the fish to be snagged in netting materials.

Behavior
This is a nocturnal species that is much more active at night. It inhabits seaward reefs below the surge zone, and is common near caves and ledges. It feeds mainly on worms, crustaceans and starfish.

References

External links

xantherythrum
Fish of Hawaii
Endemic fauna of Hawaii
Fish described in 1903
Taxa named by David Starr Jordan
Taxa named by Barton Warren Evermann